Samsung B7610 (also known as Samsung Omnia Pro B7610) is a smartphone produced by Samsung as part of their Omnia Series line of mobile phones. The B7610 OmniaPRO runs Windows Mobile 6.1 or 6.5 Professional, with a TouchWiz 2.0 user interface. The phone has a physical and virtual QWERTY keyboard.

Its capabilities include: a Global Positioning System receiver with maps and optional turn-by-turn navigation; an autofocus 5-megapixel digital camera with LED flash, flash, video recording and video conferencing; wireless connectivity via HSDPA, DLNA, Wi-Fi 802.11 b/g and Bluetooth; a portable media player with the ability to download files over the air; Composite Video output via optional cable; multi-tasking to allow several applications to run simultaneously; a web browser with support for HTML, JavaScript and Adobe Flash; messaging via SMS, MMS and e-mail; Office suite and organizer functions; and the ability to install and run third party Java ME or Windows Mobile applications.

History
The Samsung B7610 OmniaPRO is featured by Samsung in an event held at CommunicAsia 2009 in the month of June and was reported to be available in July.

Specification sheet

References

External links

Samsung smartphones
Mobile phones introduced in 2009